The 2013 Kerry Senior Football Championship was the 113th staging of the Kerry Senior Football Championship since its establishment by the Kerry County Board in 1889. The championship ran from 8 June to 30 November 2013.

Dr. Crokes entered the championship as the defending champions in search of a fourth successive title.

The final was played on 20 October 2013 at FitzGerald Stadium in Killarney, between Dr. Crokes and Austin Stacks in what was their third meeting in the final. Dr. Crokes won the match by 4-16 to 0-12 to claim their 19th championship title overall and a fourth title in succession.

Shane Carroll was the championship's top scorer with 2-26.

Team changes

To Championship

Promoted from the Kerry Intermediate Football Championship
 Finuge

From Championship

Relegated to the Kerry Intermediate Football Championship
 Gneeveguilla

Results

Round 1

Round 2

Relegation playoff

Round 3 

 Rathmore received a bye in this round.

Quarter-finals

Semi-finals

Final

Championship statistics

Top scorers

Overall

In a single game

Miscellaneous

 Dr. Crokes became the first club since John Mitchels in 1962 to win four titles in-a-row.
 Finuge made their first appearance at senior level.

References

Kerry Senior Football Championship
Kerry Senior Football Championship
Kerry SFC